Scopula aniara  is a moth of the family Geometridae. It was described by Prout in 1934. It is endemic to Costa Rica.

References

Moths described in 1934
aniara
Endemic fauna of Costa Rica
Moths of Central America
Taxa named by Louis Beethoven Prout